Hugo Duncan (Hugh Anthony Duncan) (born 26 March 1950, in Strabane) is a singer and BBC broadcaster born in Strabane, County Tyrone, Northern Ireland on 26 March 1950. His nickname is "The wee man from Strabane" or "Uncle Hugo".

In the early 70s, he was spotted on a TV talent show on RTÉ and signed by the then fledgling Release Records, which later spawned such stars as Philomena Begley, Ray Lynam, and Eurovision star Johnny Logan.

By the time he was twenty-one he had formed his own band, Hugo Duncan and the Tall Men, and had a number one hit in the Irish charts with "Dear God”

Hugo joined Radio Foyle during the 1980s doing holiday relief, after which he was offered a job presenting his own show on a weekly basis.  He also presents a show on Radio Foyle, every Sunday from 14:00 to 16:00.

In October 1998, he was given the opportunity to present Hugo Duncan's Country Afternoon on Radio Ulster each weekday from 13:30 to 15:00. The theme tune used on his BBC Radio Ulster show is "Rocky Top", while he closes each programme with "Yakety Sax" (also known as the theme to The Benny Hill Show).

In 2001, along with Eamonn Holmes, Hugo appeared in episode two of series one of popular BBC NI comedy Give My Head Peace.

Hugo is also a member of BBC Northern Ireland's team during their annual Children in Need appeal. In 2006, Hugo dressed up as Britney Spears and performed a version of her song "...Baby One More Time".

In addition to his radio work, Duncan plays regularly on the live circuit with shows throughout Ireland on a nightly basis, and regular tours to England and Scotland.

External links
 Hugo Duncan (BBC Radio Ulster)
 Discography
 Photos Of Hugo Duncan Outside Broadcast in Portadown Co. Armagh
 

1950 births
Living people
Male singers from Northern Ireland
People from Strabane
Musicians from County Tyrone
Irish country singers